Virumaa Teataja is newspaper published in Rakvere, Estonia.

Earlier names
Virumaa Teataja (1925–1940)
Punane Virumaa (1940–1941)
Virumaa Teataja (1941–1944)
Viru Sõna (1944–1950)
Punane Täht (1950–1988)
Viru Sõna (1988–1993)
Virumaa Teataja (1993–)

References

External links

Newspapers published in Estonia
Rakvere